The Czech Republic competed at the 2022 Winter Olympics in Beijing, China, from 4 to 20 February 2022.

Michal Březina and Alena Mills were the country's flagbearer during the opening ceremony. Meanwhile speed skater Martina Sáblíková was the flagbearer during the closing ceremony.

After winning seven medals in 2018, the Czech Republic's medal haul fell to a single gold and single bronze medal in Beijing, marking its weakest performance since 1994.

Medalists 

The following Czech competitors won medals at the games. In the discipline sections below, the medalists' names are bolded.

Competitors
The following is the list of number of competitors participating at the Games per sport/discipline.

Alpine skiing

The Czech Republic qualified two men and six women alpine skiers.

Men

Women

Mixed

Biathlon 

Based on their Nations Cup rankings in the 2021–22 Biathlon World Cup, the Czech Republic has qualified a team of 5 men and 5 women.

Men

Women

Mixed

Bobsleigh 

Based on their rankings in the 2021–22 Bobsleigh World Cup, the Czech Republic has qualified 2 sleds.

* – Denotes the driver of each sled

Cross-country skiing

The Czech Republic will be sending a team of six male and five female cross-country skiers.

Distance
Men

Women

Sprint

Curling

Czech Republic's curling team consisted of two athletes (one per gender), competing in the mixed doubles tournament.

Summary

Mixed doubles tournament

Czech Republic has qualified their mixed doubles team (two athletes), by finishing in the top seven teams in the 2021 World Mixed Doubles Curling Championship.

Round robin
Czech Republic had a bye in draws 3, 5, 7 and 12.

Draw 1
Wednesday, 2 February, 20:05

Draw 2
Thursday, 3 February, 9:05

Draw 4
Thursday, 3 February, 20:05

Draw 6
Friday, 4 February, 13:35

Draw 8
Saturday, 5 February, 14:05

Draw 9
Saturday, 5 February, 20:05

Draw 10
Sunday, 6 February, 9:05

Draw 11
Sunday, 6 February, 14:05

Draw 13
Monday, 7 February, 9:05

Figure skating

Czech skaters earned one quota place each in men's singles, ladies' singles and pair skating at the 2021 World Figure Skating Championships in Stockholm, and one quota place in ice dancing at the 2021 CS Nebelhorn Trophy. The Czech Figure Skating Association has stated that the specific skaters who earned Olympic quotas are automatically entitled to use them.

Team event

Freestyle skiing 

Ski cross

Ice hockey

Summary
Key:
 OT – Overtime
 GWS – Match decided by penalty-shootout

The Czech Republic has qualified 25 male and 23 female competitors in ice hockey. This is the first time the Czech Republic has qualified a women's team to the Olympics.

Men's tournament

The Czech Republic men's national ice hockey team qualified by being ranked 5th in the 2019 IIHF World Rankings.

Team roster

Group play

Playoffs

Women's tournament

The Czech Republic women's national ice hockey team qualified by winning a final qualification tournament.

Team roster

Group play

Quarterfinals

Luge 

Based on the results from the World Cups during the 2021–22 Luge World Cup season, the Czech Republic qualified 3 sleds.

Mixed team relay

Nordic combined 

Czech Republic qualified 4 athletes:

Short track speed skating 

The Czech Republic qualified one skater for women's 500m and 1500 m events for the Olympics during the four World Cup events in October and November 2021.

Skeleton 

Based on the world rankings, Czech republic qualified 1 sled.

Ski jumping 

Czech Republic qualified 5 male and 3 female ski jumpers:

Men

Women

Mixed

Snowboarding 

Freestyle

Parallel

Snowboard cross

Speed skating

The Czech Republic earned the following quotas at the conclusion of the four World Cup's used for qualification.

Individual

Mass start

References

Nations at the 2022 Winter Olympics
2022
Winter Olympics